Ak-Talaa is a village in Naryn Region of Kyrgyzstan. Its population was 832 in 2021.

References
 

Populated places in Naryn Region